Shadowed Eyes is a 1940 British crime film directed by Maclean Rogers and starring Basil Sydney, Patricia Hilliard and Stewart Rome. The screenplay involves a leading surgeon who murders his wife's lover.

Partial cast
 Basil Sydney - Doctor Zander
 Patricia Hilliard - Doctor Diana Barnes
 Stewart Rome - Sir John Barnes
 Ian Fleming - Doctor McKane
 Tom Helmore - Ian
 Dorothy Calve - Marjorie
 Ruby Miller - Mrs Clarke-Fenwick

References

External links

1940 films
Films directed by Maclean Rogers
1940 crime films
British crime films
British black-and-white films
1940s English-language films
1940s British films